Tianfu Park is a station on Line 1 of the Chengdu Metro in China.

Station layout

Gallery

References

Railway stations in Sichuan
Railway stations in China opened in 2018
Chengdu Metro stations